Miner Kilbourne Kellogg (1814-1889) was an American painter noted for his Orientalist work, an art historian and art collector.

Life and career

Kellogg was born in Manlius Square, New York in 1814. He painted primarily portraits, figures and landscapes. At one time he worked as a courier on behalf of the United States Department of State. As a courier he traveled to Europe. Kellogg also was a land surveyor in Texas. He also was an art historian and an art collector. His personal art collection included works attributed to Leonardo da Vinci and Raphael. He died in Toledo, Ohio in 1889.

His archives are held in the collections of the University of Texas at Austin and the Indiana Historical Society. In 1851 he was elected into the National Academy of Design as an Honorary Academician.

Notable collections
Persian Women, Smithsonian American Art Museum, Washington, D.C.

Works

References

1814 births
1889 deaths
19th-century American painters
19th-century American male artists
American art historians
American male painters
American portrait painters
American surveyors
Artists from Toledo, Ohio
American art collectors
Orientalist painters
Painters from New York (state)
Painters from Ohio
Historians from Ohio